Aya Kassem Al Jurdi (born 8 April 1998) is a Lebanese footballer who plays as a defender for Lebanese club SAS and the Lebanon national team.

International career 
Al Jurdi was called up to represent Lebanon at the 2022 WAFF Women's Championship, helping her side finish runners-up.

Career statistics

International
Scores and results list Lebanon's goal tally first, score column indicates score after each Al Jurdi goal.

Honours 
SAS
 Lebanese Women's Football League: 2018–19, 2019–20, 2021–22

Lebanon
 WAFF Women's Championship runner-up: 2022; third place: 2019

Lebanon U17
 Arab U-17 Women's Cup: 2015

See also
 List of Lebanon women's international footballers

References

External links

 
 

1998 births
Living people
People from Aley District
Lebanese women's footballers
Women's association football defenders
Stars Association for Sports players
Lebanese Women's Football League players
Lebanon women's youth international footballers
Lebanon women's international footballers